John Mulvihill may refer to:
 John Mulvihill (politician) (born 1945), Irish Labour Party politician
 John Mulvihill (rugby union) (born 1966), Australian rugby coach